Rashaun Dorrell Woods (born October 17, 1980) is a former American college and professional football player who was a wide receiver in the National Football League (NFL) and Canadian Football League (CFL) for two seasons during the early 2000s.  Woods played college football for Oklahoma State University, and received All-American honors.  He was selected by the San Francisco 49ers in the first round of the 2004 NFL Draft, and played professionally for the NFL's 49ers and the CFL's Toronto Argonauts.
Woods currently coaches at Enid High School in Enid, Oklahoma (2019-present).

Early years
Woods was born in Oklahoma City, Oklahoma.  He attended Millwood High School in Oklahoma City, and played for the Millwood high school football team.

College career
While attending Oklahoma State University, Woods played for the Oklahoma State Cowboys football team from 2000 to 2003.  He finished his college career with 293 receptions, 4,414 yards and 42 touchdowns—all Big 12 records.  Woods was a two-time all-American, including being recognized as a consensus first-team All-American in 2002.  He became the eighth player in NCAA Division I-A annals to gain over 1,000 yards receiving in a season three times in a career.  Woods also holds the NCAA single-game record for most touchdown receptions in a game (7 against Southern Methodist University in 2003) and most touchdown receptions in a half (5 in the first half of the same SMU game). All seven touchdowns were thrown by former Kansas City Royals infielder Josh Fields.  In 2001, his biggest touchdown catch made during his college career was against Oklahoma Sooners down in Norman, where the unranked OSU Cowboys upset the highly ranked Sooners. Also, the following year he had 3 touchdowns against the Sooners, in the annual Bedlam game 2002.

Woods has two brothers who followed him to Oklahoma State. D'Juan who graduated in 2007, who played wide receiver and Donovan, a former Oklahoma State linebacker who spent time at safety and quarterback, graduated in 2008. D'Juan was picked up by the Jacksonville Jaguars as a free agent after the 2007 NFL draftJaguars.com while Donovan was a practice squad member of the 2008-09 Pittsburgh Steelers Super Bowl Championship team.

Professional career
Woods had 7 catches for 160 yards and 1 touchdown in his rookie season (2004) and spent the 2005 season on injured reserve with torn ligaments in his thumb.  In April 2006, he was traded to the San Diego Chargers for cornerback Sammy Davis. In August 2006, he was cut from the San Diego Chargers. On August 3, 2006, he was claimed off waivers by the Denver Broncos but failed his physical and was released. In Dec. of 2006 he worked out with the Minnesota Vikings.

NFL Europa
In 2007, the Hamburg Sea Devils selected Woods in the 5th round of the NFL Europa free agent draft.

CFL career

On July 23, 2007, Woods signed with the Toronto Argonauts of the Canadian Football League.  He was released by the Toronto Argonauts on August 8, 2007.  He was signed by the Hamilton Tiger-Cats on October 4, 2007. On June 22, 2008 Woods was 1 of 14 players to be cut from the Hamilton Tiger-Cats final roster.

Coaching career
After his playing career ended, Woods worked as an assistant football coach at Millwood and at Star Spencer High School, and also as a high school football radio commentator and professional bass fisherman. In January 2013, Woods was selected to be head football coach at John Marshall High School in Oklahoma City. He led John Marshall to the 3A state championship in 2017. In January 2019, Woods was named head football coach for Enid High School in Enid, Oklahoma.  Rashaun Woods announced Friday morning, Jan. 20, 2023, he has accepted a head football coaching position at Tyler High School in Tyler, TX, effective immediately.

See also 
 List of NCAA major college football yearly receiving leaders
 List of NCAA Division I FBS career receiving touchdowns leaders

References

External links
 Player Profile
 NFL draft profile
 Hamilton Tiger-Cats
 Rashaun Woods Angler Profile at FLW Outdoors

1980 births
Living people
All-American college football players
American football wide receivers
American players of Canadian football
Canadian football wide receivers
Oklahoma State Cowboys football players
Sportspeople from Oklahoma City
San Francisco 49ers players
San Diego Chargers players
Toronto Argonauts players